Fred Blaney (born 14 November 1955) is a Canadian judoka. He competed in the men's open category event at the 1984 Summer Olympics.

See also 
 Judo in New Brunswick
 Judo in Canada
 List of Canadian judoka

References

External links
 

1955 births
Living people
Canadian male judoka
Olympic judoka of Canada
Judoka at the 1984 Summer Olympics
Sportspeople from Greater Sudbury
Pan American Games medalists in judo
Pan American Games silver medalists for Canada
Pan American Games bronze medalists for Canada
Judoka at the 1983 Pan American Games
Judoka at the 1987 Pan American Games
Medalists at the 1983 Pan American Games
Medalists at the 1987 Pan American Games
20th-century Canadian people
21st-century Canadian people